Throughout 2008, 124 tropical cyclones have formed in bodies of water known as tropical cyclone basins. The strongest storm of the year was Typhoon Jangmi in the Western Pacific Ocean. The deadliest storm of the year was Cyclone Nargis, which caused devastating and castatrophic destruction in Myanmar with 138,373 fatalities. The costliest storm of the year was Hurricane Ike, which wreaked havoc thorough Cuba and Texas, with $38 billion (2008 USD) in damage. Throughout the year, 24 Category 3 tropical cyclones formed, including one Category 5 tropical cyclone in the year.

Tropical cyclones are primarily monitored by a group of ten warning centres, which have been designated as a Regional Specialized Meteorological Center (RSMC) or a Tropical Cyclone Warning Center (TCWC) by the World Meteorological Organization. These are the United States National Hurricane Center (NHC) and Central Pacific Hurricane Center, the Japan Meteorological Agency (JMA), the India Meteorological Department (IMD), Météo-France, Indonesia's Badan Meteorologi, Klimatologi, dan Geofisika, the Australian Bureau of Meteorology (BOM), Papua New Guinea's National Weather Service, the Fiji Meteorological Service (FMS) as well as New Zealand's MetService. Other notable warning centres include the Philippine Atmospheric, Geophysical and Astronomical Services Administration (PAGASA), the United States Joint Typhoon Warning Center (JTWC), and the Brazilian Navy Hydrographic Center.

Global atmospheric and hydrological conditions

La Niña conditions often follow El Niño in the cycle known as the El Niño/Southern Oscillation (ENSO). La Niña episodes are marked by stronger-than-normal easterly trade winds and below-normal sea surface temperatures in the eastern tropical Pacific Ocean. These changes in ocean temperature and atmospheric circulation have worldwide implications for weather patterns. La Niña conditions appeared in February 2007 and strengthened in October and November. La Niña conditions often peak in January, as they appeared to do in January 2008.

This image shows the temperature anomaly for the top millimeter of the Pacific Ocean's surface—the skin temperature—on January 14, 2008, based on data from the Advanced Microwave Scanning Radiometer (AMSR-E) flying on NASA's Aqua satellite. In this image, January 14, 2008, temperatures are compared to the long-term average measured by a series of sensors that flew on NOAA Pathfinder satellites from 1985 to 1997. A strong band of blue (cool) water appears along the Equator, fanning out near North and South America. Patches of orange to red (warm) conditions appear north and south of this strong blue band. As of January 2008, the U.S. National Oceanic and Atmospheric Administration (NOAA) predicted that La Niña conditions would continue until spring, with a possible weakening in February 2008.

Cool ocean temperatures can impede cloud growth, leading to reduced rainfall from South America to Indonesia. In the continental United States, La Niña affects the jet stream, which in turn affects weather. Typical La Niña winter weather patterns include very cool, wet conditions in the Pacific Northwest, especially cold winter conditions on the Great Plains, and unusually dry conditions in the Southwest and Southeast. Because La Niña conditions can persist for years, such adverse weather conditions can continue. In short, continued La Niña conditions were expected to prolong the droughts in the American Southeast and Southwest.

Summary

North Atlantic Ocean 

The 2008 Atlantic hurricane season was the most destructive Atlantic hurricane season since 2005, causing over 1,000 deaths and nearly $50 billion (2008 USD) in damage. The season ranked as the third costliest ever at the time, but has since fallen to seventh costliest. It was an above-average season, featuring sixteen named storms, eight of which became hurricanes, and five which further became major hurricanes. It officially started on June 1 and ended on November 30. However, the formation of Tropical Storm Arthur caused the season to start one day early. It was the only year on record in which a major hurricane existed in every month from July through November in the North Atlantic. Bertha became the longest-lived July tropical cyclone on record for the basin, the first of several long-lived systems during 2008.

The season was devastating for Haiti, where nearly 800 people were killed by four consecutive tropical cyclones (Fay, Gustav, Hanna, and Ike), especially Hurricane Hanna, in August and September. These four storms caused about $1 billion in damage in Haiti alone. The precursor to Kyle and the outer rain bands of Paloma also impacted Haiti. Cuba also received extensive impacts from Gustav, Ike, and Paloma, with Gustav and Ike making landfall in the country at major hurricane intensity and Paloma being a Category 2 when striking the nation. More than $10 billion in damage and 8 deaths occurred there.

Ike was the most destructive storm of the season, as well as the strongest in terms of minimum barometric pressure, devastating Cuba as a major hurricane and later making landfall near Galveston, Texas, as a large high-end Category 2 hurricane. One very unusual feat was a streak of tropical cyclones affecting land, with all but one system impacting land in 2008. The unusual number of storms with impact led to one of the deadliest and destructive seasons in the history of the Atlantic basin, especially with Ike, as its overall damages made it the second-costliest hurricane in the Atlantic at the time, although it would later drop to sixth after hurricanes Sandy, Harvey, Irma, and Maria.

Overall, the season's activity was reflected with a total cumulative accumulated cyclone energy (ACE) rating of 146, which was well above the normal average, and was the highest value since 2005. ACE is, broadly speaking, a measure of the power of the hurricane multiplied by the length of time it existed, so storms that last a long time, as well as particularly strong hurricanes, have high ACEs. It is only calculated for full advisories on tropical systems at or exceeding , which is the threshold for tropical storm strength.

Eastern Pacific Ocean 

The 2008 Pacific hurricane season was a near average season which produced seventeen named storms, though most were rather weak and short-lived. Only seven hurricanes formed and two major hurricanes. The season officially began on May 15 in the East Pacific Ocean, and on June 1 in the Central Pacific; they ended on November 30. These dates conventionally delimit the period of each year when most tropical cyclones form in the Pacific basin. However, the formation of tropical cyclones is possible at any time of the year.

This season is the first since 1996 to have no cyclones cross into the central Pacific. There were only a few notable storms this year. Tropical Storm Alma made landfall along the Pacific coast of Nicaragua, becoming the first known storm to do so. It killed 9 and did US$35 million in damage (value in 2008). It also became the first tropical storm to be retired in the Eastern Pacific basin. Hurricane Norbert became the strongest hurricane to hit the western side of the Baja Peninsula on record, killing 25.

The accumulated cyclone energy (ACE) index for the 2008 Pacific hurricane season was 82.135 units in the Eastern Pacific and 1.5925 units in the Central Pacific. The total ACE in the basin is  units. Broadly speaking, ACE is a measure of the power of a tropical or subtropical storm multiplied by the length of time it existed.

Western Pacific Ocean 

The 2008 Pacific typhoon season was a below average season which featured 22 named storms, eleven typhoons, and two super typhoons. The first tropical depression of the season, formed in mid January to the west of the Philippines. As it moved west, the depression did not develop any further and dissipated on January 18. After two more Tropical depressions, the first named storm, Typhoon Neoguri formed in April to the east of Mindanao. During May as a result of convection being enhanced within the Philippine Sea and the South China Sea, four named storms formed which along with 1971 and 1980 was the joint highest incidence in May since 1951. Between June and October, the region was considered to be very quiet by the JMA as they only named 13 tropical cyclones. In November and December, only four tropical cyclones were named by the JMA and all four formed within the Philippine sea and the South China Sea. Typhoon Jangmi became the strongest tropical cyclone this 2008 and for this typhoon season, with  sustained winds.

North Indian Ocean 

The 2008 North Indian cyclone season was one of the most disastrous tropical cyclone seasons in modern history, with tropical cyclones leaving more than 140,000 people dead and causing more than US$15 billion in damage, making it the costliest  season in the North Indian Ocean, until it was made second in 2020. The IMD monitored a total of ten depressions across the North Indian Ocean, significantly below the average of fifteen. Of these systems, seven developed into deep depressions, four into cyclonic storms, and one into a very severe cyclonic storm. Activity was mostly limited to the Bay of Bengal, with only two depressions developing in the Arabian Sea. Somewhat unusually, no depression developed during the month of July due to the lack of a prominent monsoon. Collectively, there were a total of 30 days of activity in the basin, with no storms existing simultaneously.

South-West Indian Ocean

January–June 

The 2007–08 South-West Indian Ocean cyclone season was the third most active tropical cyclone season, along with the 1985–86 season and behind the 1993–94 season and the 2018–19 season, with twelve named tropical cyclones developing in the region. It began on November 15, 2007, and ended on April 30, 2008, with the exception for Mauritius and the Seychelles, which ended on May 15.

July–December 

The 2008–09 South-West Indian Ocean cyclone season was a slightly above average event in tropical cyclone formation. It began on November 15, 2008, and officially ended on April 30, 2009, with the exception for Mauritius and the Seychelles, for which it ended on May 15, 2009.

As predicted by the sub regional office of Mauritius ten named storms formed in this basin. It officially began on November 15, but began 1 month earlier when Tropical Storm Asma formed on October 16. Most of the storms that formed this year were weak or stayed at sea. Only two storms reached hurricane strength this year, both of which were Category 3 or higher, and only 3 storms made landfall in the entire season. Overall, the impact of this season was relatively minor, but damaging for Madagascar, due to the heavy rains from Eric, Fanele, Izilda and Jade.

Australian Region

January–June  

The 2007–08 Australian region cyclone season was a slightly below-average tropical cyclone season. The season began with an early start, with the formation of the first tropical cyclone on July 29, which was only recognized as a tropical cyclone during post-season analysis. This was the second time that a tropical cyclone had formed during July. The other one was Cyclone Lindsay in the 1996–1997 season. The next tropical cyclone that formed was Cyclone Guba, which formed on November 13 with TCWC Port Moresby assigning the name Guba on November 14, which was the first named storm within TCWC Port Moresby's area of responsibility since Cyclone Epi in June 2003. Guba was also the first cyclone to occur in the Queensland region in  November since 1977.

Tropical Cyclone Lee also formed on November 13 and was named by TCWC Perth on November 14, with the system moving into RSMC Réunion's area of responsibility and being renamed Ariel. The next Cyclone to form within the Australian region was Melanie, which formed on December 27, and was named on the 28th by TCWC Perth. Melanie was the first storm of the season to require cyclone watches, and warnings were issued for the Pilbara coast, but it had weakened into a low-pressure area before it made landfall.

Tropical Cyclone Helen was the first tropical cyclone to form in 2008, in the Southern Hemisphere, forming in TCWC Darwin's area of responsibility. Helen marked the first time that Darwin had experienced a tropical cyclone since Cyclone Gretel in the 1984–85 season. Cyclone Nicholas made landfall north of Carnarvon on February 20, as a category one cyclone. Cyclone Ophelia actually formed in TCWC Darwin's area of responsibility, but had moved into TCWC Perth's area when it was named.

In April 2008, Tropical Cyclones Rosie and Durga were the first tropical depressions to be monitored within TCWC Jakarta's area of responsibility and Durga was also the first storm to reach tropical cyclone status and named whilst being monitored by TCWC Jakarta. Durga was also the last storm of the season, which officially ended on April 30.

July–December  

The 2008–09 Australian region cyclone season was a near average tropical cyclone season. It officially started on November 1, 2008, and officially ended on April 30, 2009. This season was also the first time that the BoM implemented a "tropical cyclone year." The regional tropical cyclone operational plan defines a "tropical cyclone year" separately from a "tropical cyclone season"; the "tropical cyclone year" began on July 1, 2008, and ended on June 30, 2009.

South Pacific Ocean

January–June 

The 2007–08 South Pacific cyclone season was one of the least active South Pacific tropical cyclone season's on record, with only four tropical cyclones occurring within the South Pacific basin to the east of 160°E. The season officially ran from November 1, 2007, until April 30, 2008, although the first cyclone, Tropical Depression 01F, developed on October 17. After the season had ended, the names Daman, Funa, and Gene were retired from the tropical cyclone naming lists.

July–December  

During the season, a total of fifteen significant tropical disturbances were monitored and numbered by the Fiji Meteorological Service (FMS), within the South Pacific basin between 160°E and 120°W. Off these tropical disturbances, six became named tropical cyclones, while none developed into severe tropical cyclones for the first time since the 1994–95 season. The first tropical disturbance of the season developed on December 1, while the final system Tropical Disturbance 15F was last noted in the basin during April 10.

Notable Tropical depressions include Tropical Depression 04F, which caused Fiji's second worst natural disasters. Tropical Depression 08F, which intensified into Cyclone Hettie becoming the first tropical cyclone to form this season. Tropical Depression 10F brought heavy rains to Vanuatu and before making landfall on New Caledonia intensified into Category One Tropical Cyclone Innis. After it made landfall Innis became the first Tropical Depression to move into TCWC Brisbane's Area of responsibility since Cyclone Larry. Cyclones Joni and Ken both threatened the Southern Cook Islands however the only impact they had was minimal. Cyclone Jasper then moved into the region early on March 24 at peak intensity, having developed inside TCWC Brisbane's area of responsibility two days earlier. The final disturbance this year to develop was 15F to the northeast of the Solomon Islands.

Mediterranean Sea 

In the Mediterranean Sea, there were 3 Mediterranean tropical-like cyclones formed, but they aren't well-documented.
June 2008, August 2008, and September 2008, December 4, 2008 were the dates when they took shape. The damages, deaths, and the affected places are unknown.

Systems
A total of 124 systems formed globally in the year with 83 of them causing significant damage, deaths, and/or setting records for their basin.

January

The month of January was moderately active, seeing eleven tropical cyclones develop, with five being named. Tropical Cyclone Elisa affected Tonga and Niue as a tropical cyclone on early January, whileSevere Tropical Cyclone Funa became the second strongest tropical cyclone during the 2007–08 South Pacific cyclone season, causing heavy flood and wind damage to Vanuatu. On the South-West Indian Ocean basin,  3 more systems formed on the South-West Indian Ocean basin: 07, Fame and Gula, which caused torrential rainfall and gusty winds to the Mascarene Islands and Madagascar.  08F, 09F, 11F, and Guna formed on the South Pacific basin, while 2 systems formed in the West Pacific basin: 01W and an unmonitored weak tropical depression.

February

The month of February is tied with May as the second least active month in terms of formed systems with 7 tropical systems; however, 4 were named and developed hurricane-force winds and were classified as severe tropical cyclones. No tropical cyclones developed within the Northern Hemisphere, the fourth occurrence since 2005. Cyclone Hondo was the strongest and longest-lived tropical cyclone to develop during the 2007–08 South-West Indian Ocean cyclone season, which affected Mauritius and Reunion. On the South-west Indian Ocean basin, one more system formed: Cyclone Ivan which devastated Madagascar as an intense tropical cyclone. On the Australian basin, 4 systems took shape: a tropical low, Nicholas, Ophelia, and 20P. On the South Pacific basin, 13F formed, which affected Cook Islands in its lifetime.

March

March is tied with April and June as the least active month, with just six tropical cyclones; however, four of them are named. Intense Tropical Cyclone Jokwe was the first tropical cyclone to make landfall in Mozambique since Cyclone Favio struck in the previous year, and was the most recent cyclone to make landfall on the same country until it was overtaken by Cyclone Dineo in 2017. 2 more systems formed in the southwest Indian Ocean basin: Kamba and Lola., with the latter affecting Mauritius. 14F formed on the South Pacific basin and brought little to none damages on New Caledonia, while Pancho formed on the Australian basin, affecting Christmas Island and Western Australia as a severe tropical cyclone. A tropical depression on the West Pacific was identified on March 26–27, affecting the Philippines.

April

The month of April is tied with March and June as the least active month, with just 6 systems developing; however, 4 are respectively named. Typhoon Neoguri was the earliest tropical cyclone on record to strike the mainland China, which left 26 deaths and over $65 million worth of damages to the said country. Also included here is Cyclone Nargis which is an extremely destructive and deadly tropical cyclone, and became the second-costliest tropical cyclone recorded in the Indian Ocean, just after Cyclone Amphan in 2020. It left an unconfirmed total of 138,373 deaths; mainly on Myanmar and $12.9 billion worth of damages. 2 depressions formed on the South Pacific basin and affected Vanuatu and New Caledonia: 15F and 16F. Rosie and Durga formed on the Australian region; bringing minor damages and rainfall on Christmas Island and Cocos Islands.

May

The month of May was tied with February as the second-least active month, with seven systems developing; six of those being named. Included here is Typhoon Rammasun, which brought gusty rainfalls across eastern Philippines and paralleled on Japan before weakening. Matmo, a tropical depression, Nakri and Tropical Storm Halong also formed on the West Pacific, affecting Philippines, Japan, the Kamchatka Peninsula and the Mariana Islands. Tropical Storm Alma formed on the East Pacific basin. As it dissipated over Central America, its remnants interacted with two tropical waves, subsequently forming Tropical Storm Arthur on the Atlantic, which worsened the situations on the place which Alma made landfall.

June

The month of June is tied with March and April for the most inactive month with 6 systems developing; however, 3 are named. Fengshen made a direct hit on the Philippines and China, causing severe damage and resulted in at least 1,371 deaths and leaving at least 87 people missing. Another unmonitored tropical depression struck Taiwan and affected South Korea on June 6. On the North Indian Ocean basin, ARB 01 and BOB 02 formed; bringing torrential rainfall and damages on Oman, India and Bangladesh. Boris and Cristina took shape on the East Pacific basin; however, they stayed well from the land. An unidentified medicane formed in June 2008, however, it was unknown.

July

During July, thirteen tropical cyclones formed and the month became the third-most active month of the year, with ten of the cyclones being named. Included here is Bertha, which became the longest-lived Atlantic tropical cyclone on record during the month of July. It affected the East Coast of the United States and  Bermuda, leaving 3 fatalities and minimal damages. A near hurricane-strength Cristobal skirted Florida and The Carolinas as a developing tropical storm, and the Atlantic Canada as an extratropical storm. Dolly severely impacted Texas, New Mexico and Arizona as a Category 3 major hurricane, while it affected the Yucatán Peninsula and Mexico as a tropical storm. It was responsible for 22 fatalities and $1.6 billion worth of damages. Back in the West Pacific, the activity started with Gener which impacted Guangdong Province in China. Kalmaegi followed, skirting to the east of Philippines before impacting Taiwan and China. It was responsible for $332.3 million worth of damages and 25 deaths. Adding on, Fung-wong severely impacted Taiwan as a Category 2 typhoon, just 10 days after Kalmaegi lashed the country. 2 more weak depressions formed; however, it didn't affect any landmasses. On the East Pacific, Douglas started the activity, skirting to the northeast of Mexico. A tropical depression brought torrential rainfalls across Southwestern Mexico, leaving 2 deaths and $2.2 million worth of damages. Elida, Fausto and Genevieve followed suit; however, it didn't affect any major landmasses, but it brought rainfalls across Clarion Island and Socorro Island.

August

August was the second most active month of the year, seeing 18 tropical cyclones forming and 14 named storms.

September

October

November

December

Global effects

Notes 
1 Only systems that formed either on or after January 1, 2008 are counted in the seasonal totals.
2 Only systems that formed either before or on December 31, 2008 are counted in the seasonal totals.3 The wind speeds for this tropical cyclone/basin are based on the IMD Scale which uses 3-minute sustained winds.
4 The wind speeds for this tropical cyclone/basin are based on the Saffir Simpson Scale which uses 1-minute sustained winds.

See also 

 Tropical cyclones by year
 List of earthquakes in 2008
 Tornadoes of 2008

References

External links 

Regional Specialized Meteorological Centers
 US National Hurricane Center – North Atlantic, Eastern Pacific
 Central Pacific Hurricane Center – Central Pacific
 Japan Meteorological Agency – NW Pacific
 India Meteorological Department – Bay of Bengal and the Arabian Sea
 Météo-France – La Reunion – South Indian Ocean from 30°E to 90°E
 Fiji Meteorological Service – South Pacific west of 160°E, north of 25° S

Tropical Cyclone Warning Centers
 Meteorology, Climatology, and Geophysical Agency of Indonesia – South Indian Ocean from 90°E to 141°E, generally north of 10°S
 Australian Bureau of Meteorology (TCWC's Perth, Darwin & Brisbane) – South Indian Ocean & South Pacific Ocean from 90°E to 160°E, generally south of 10°S
 Papua New Guinea National Weather Service – South Pacific Ocean from 141°E to 160°E, generally north of 10°S
 Meteorological Service of New Zealand Limited – South Pacific west of 160°E, south of 25°S

Tropical cyclones by year
2008 Atlantic hurricane season
2008 Pacific hurricane season
2008 Pacific typhoon season
2008 North Indian Ocean cyclone season
2007–08 Australian region cyclone season
2008–09 Australian region cyclone season
2007–08 South Pacific cyclone season
2008–09 South Pacific cyclone season
2007–08 South-West Indian Ocean cyclone season
2008–09 South-West Indian Ocean cyclone season
2008-related lists